Rolv Hauge may refer to:

Rolf Hauge (army officer) (1915–1989), Norwegian army officer
Rolf Hauge (trade unionist) (1923–2002), Norwegian trade unionist